Sobieski Ross (May 16, 1828 – October 24, 1877) was a Republican member of the U.S. House of Representatives from Pennsylvania.

Sobieski Ross was born in Coudersport, Pennsylvania.  He attended the common schools and Coudersport Academy.  He engaged in civil engineering and the real estate business.  He was also interested in agricultural pursuits.  He was appointed as an associate judge in 1852.

Ross was elected as a Republican to the Forty-third and Forty-fourth Congresses.  He declined to be a candidate for renomination in 1876.  He resumed the real estate business, and died in Coudersport.  Interment in Eulalia Cemetery.

Sources

The Political Graveyard

External links 
 

1828 births
1877 deaths
American real estate businesspeople
American civil engineers
People from Potter County, Pennsylvania
Republican Party members of the United States House of Representatives from Pennsylvania
Engineers from Pennsylvania